Franz Hollitzer (born 1878, date of death unknown) was an Austrian sports shooter. He competed in the team clay pigeon event at the 1924 Summer Olympics.

References

External links
 

1878 births
Year of death missing
Austrian male sport shooters
Olympic shooters of Austria
Shooters at the 1924 Summer Olympics
Place of birth missing